The X-Rays (also known as The X-Ray Fiend) is an 1897 British short silent comedy film, directed by George Albert Smith, featuring a courting couple exposed to X-rays. The trick film, according to Michael Brooke of BFI Screenonline, "contains one of the first British examples of special effects created by means of jump cuts" Smith employs the jump-cut twice; first to transform his courting couple via "X rays," dramatized by means of the actors donning black bodysuits decorated with skeletons and with the woman holding only the metal support work of her umbrella, and then to return them and the umbrella to normal. The couple in question were played by Smith's wife Laura Bayley and Tom Green (a Brighton comedian).

References

External links

1897 films
1897 horror films
1890s science fiction comedy films
1890s British films
British black-and-white films
British silent short films
Articles containing video clips
X-rays
Films directed by George Albert Smith
British comedy horror films
British science fiction comedy films
1890s romance films
1897 comedy films
Fiction about skeletons
1897 short films
Silent comedy films
Silent horror films